The  is a museum of the history and culture of Kyoto.

The annex served as Heian Museum of Ancient History until 1986. It was designed by Tatsuno Kingo and Uheiji Nagano as the former Bank of Japan Kyoto Branch and designated as Important Cultural Property of Japan in 1969.

References

External links 

Museums in Kyoto
Art museums and galleries in Japan
City museums in Japan
Museums of Japanese art
Buildings of the Meiji period
Museums established in 1988
1988 establishments in Japan